Selimitsa is a peak rising to 2,041 m west of Torfeno Branishte Nature Reserve in northwestern Vitosha Mountain in Bulgaria.  The northern slopes of the peak are occupied by the ski runs of Konyarnika Ski Centre.  Linked by tracks to Kumata Chalet and Zlatnite Mostove Tourist Centre to the north, Selimitsa Chalet, Kladnitsa Monastery and Kladnitsa Village to the west, Matnitsa River valley and Chuypetlovo Village to the south, and the mountain's summit Cherni Vrah to the east.

See also

 Vitosha

References
 Vitosha Mountain
 Summit Post: Vitosha
 Vitosha Nature Park. Website.
 Zone Bulgaria: Vitosha
 Vitosha Map.

Vitosha
Landforms of Sofia City Province
Mountains of Bulgaria
Two-thousanders of Bulgaria